The 1962 National League was the 28th season and the seventeenth post-war season of the highest tier of motorcycle speedway in Great Britain.

Summary
With the withdrawal of New Cross Rangers and with Leicester Hunters moving down to the Provincial League, the entry list was 8 teams and so home and away fixtures were raced twice. The teams were reduced to just 7 with the mid-season closure of Ipswich Witches. Southampton Saints broke the domination of Wimbledon Dons by winning their first National League title.

Final table

Ipswich Witches resigned in mid-season.

Top Ten Riders (League only)

National Trophy
The 1962 National Trophy was the 24th edition of the Knockout Cup. Wimbledon were the winners.

First round

Semi-finals

Final

First leg

Second leg

Wimbledon were National Trophy Champions, winning on aggregate 94–74.

See also
 List of United Kingdom Speedway League Champions
 Knockout Cup (speedway)

References

Speedway National League
1962 in speedway
1962 in British motorsport